Berruchelus is an extinct genus of paracryptodiran turtle from the Paleogene of western Europe.

References

Cenozoic animals
Paleocene reptiles of Europe
Fossil taxa described in 2012
Extinct turtles
Prehistoric turtle genera